Faculty of Medicine Siriraj Hospital, Mahidol University is the oldest and largest medical school and the oldest of any kind of university faculty in Thailand. The faculty is now part of Mahidol University. Founded in 1889, the faculty was run in co-operation with Siriraj Hospital, the first public hospital in Thailand, which provides students with clinical experience. The faculty's campus and hospital is in the Bangkok Noi District, Bangkok, on the former Rear Palace. The medical school accepts about 250 students for undergraduate education and more than 100 to postgraduate studies each year.

History 
Siriraj Hospital, the first public hospital in Siam, was founded in 1888 under commissions and subsidy of King Chulalongkorn, named after the deceased Prince Siriraj Kakudhabhand. However, the modern medical practitioners were still lacking as they refused to come under government's employments. The medical school was established in May 1889 known as Bhatayakorn School ( i.e. School of Medical Practitioners). Any students who finished their Mattayom education were admitted for free for a three-year course. The school was originally taught solely by George B. McFarland. On May 1, 1893, King Chulalongkorn changed the name of the school to Rajapaethayalai ( i.e. Royal Medical College) with McFarland as the first director of the school. The school facilities and the dormitories were constructed.

In 1903, the course was expanded to four years. In 1913, Prince of Chainat, the Deputy Minister of Ministry of Education , added the natural sciences into the curriculum in addition to the medical sciences and the course was expanded to five years. The Traditional Thai Medicine major was abolished in 1915 and instead the Pharmacy major was established. On April 6, 1917, the Rajapaethayalai was annexed to newly founded Chulalongkorn University (founded by Vajiravudh's earlier decree in 1917). The medical school became the Faculty of Medicine of Chulalongkorn University and was later renamed to Faculty of Medicine and Siriraj Hospital. At Chulalongkorn University, in 1918, the medical course was expanded to six years - with first four pre-clinical years at the Faculty of Arts and Sciences of Chulalongkorn University and later two clinical years at the Siriraj Faculty.

In 1921, Siam, with Prince Mahidol the Krom Khun Songkla as the agent, negotiated with the Rockefeller Foundation to send aids for Siamese medical system and education. Men from Rockefeller reformed the medical education including Prof. A.G.Ellis who introduced pathology. In 1928, the medical certificate were granted to the students for the first time during their graduation. And in 1932, the first postgraduate medical students and first female medical students finished their educations.

As a part of educational reforms under the government led by General Phibun, the Siriraj Faculty of Medicine, along with departments of Dentistry, Pharmacy, and Veterinary Science, were carved out from Chulalongkorn University and were re-organized into the University of Medical Sciences on February 7, 1943. In 1958, the Medical Science Preparatory School (now Faculty of Science, Mahidol University) was established and the first-year students had then received preliminary education from that Preparatory School at Phaya Thai. The Siriraj Faculty became one of the several medical schools within the University of Medical Sciences.

On February 21, 1969, an announcement under the name of King Bhumibol Adulyadej declared the name of the medical university to be changed to Mahidol University. The school name was changed to Faculty of Medicine Siriraj Hospital (deleting the "and"). In 1983, the Salaya campus was completed and the Faculty of Science was partially moved to Salaya campus, so as the education of Siriraj's first-year students.

Under the patronage of Prince Mahidol Adulyadej and support from the Rockefeller Foundation, Siriraj became one of the most advanced medical services and research centers in Thailand and Southeast Asia.

The Faculty of Medicine Siriraj Hospital is one of the two medical schools within Mahidol University. The younger sister is the Faculty of Medicine Ramathibodi Hospital, Mahidol University.

Departments

Department of Anatomy
Department of Anesthesiology
Department of Biochemistry
Department of Clinical Pathology
Department of Dermatology
Department of Forensic Medicine
Department of Immunology
Department of Medicine
Department of Microbiology
Department of Obstetrics and Gynaecology
Department of Ophthalmology
Department of Orthopaedic Surgery
Department of Otolaryngology
Department of Parasitology
Department of Pathology
Department of Pediatrics
Department of Pharmacology
Department of Physiology
Department of Preventive and Social Medicine
Department of Psychiatrics
Department of Radiology
Department of Rehabilitstion Medicine
Department of Surgery
Department of Transfusion Medicine
Center of Applied Thai Traditional Medicine
Medical Education Technology Center
Siriraj Cancer Center
Office for Research and Development
Her Majesty Cardiac Center

Programs
The faculty now offers five undergraduate programs, ten postgraduate programs, and five doctorate programs.

Apart from regular programs, the Siriraj faculty also offers numerous resident specialty programs, sub-specialty programs, and fellowship programs.

As of the 2018 intake, 302 undergraduate medical students are accepted through a variety of categories

Medical Museum

Siriraj Hospital has a number of exhibits in a Siriraj Medical Museum that is open from 9 am to 4 pm Monday to Saturday. The bulk of the exhibits are located on the second floor in the hospital's Adulayadejvikrom Building. They include a forensic medicine museum, displaying objects from homicide, suicide and accident cases, such as skulls, bones, skeletons, preserved body parts  and organs, including the entire preserved body of a convicted murder. The skeleton of Dr. Songkran Niyomsane, who founded the forensic museum is displayed as well. The exhibit also contains the autopsy instruments that were used in the case of King Ananda Mahidol's mysterious death.

Other exhibitions are devoted to Thai traditional medicine, anatomy, prehistoric artifacts, rare diseases and parasitic organisms.

Main Teaching Hospital
 Siriraj Hospital

Affiliated Teaching Hospitals 

 Bangkok
 Lerdsin Hospital
 Charoenkrung Pracharak Hospital
 Nopparat Rajathanee Hospital
 Somdech Phra Pinklao Hospital, Naval Medical Department
 Taksin Hospital
 Bangkok Metropolitan Administration General Hospital
 Sirindhorn Hospital
 Provincial
 Phra Nang Klao Hospital, Nonthaburi Province
 Nakhon Pathom Hospital, Nakhon Pathom Province
 Samut Sakhon Hospital, Samut Sakhon Province
 Ban Phaeo Hospital, Samut Sakhon Province
 Krathum Baen Hospital, Samut Sakhon Province
 Phaholpolpayuhasena Hospital, Kanchanaburi Province
 Hua Hin Hospital, Prachuap Khiri Khan Province
 Damnoen Saduak Hospital, Ratchaburi Province
 Ban Pong Hospital, Ratchaburi Province
 Sawanpracharak Hospital, Nakhon Sawan Province
 Buddhachinaraj Phitsanulok Hospital, Phitsanulok Province

Non-teaching Hospitals Operated 

 Siriraj Piyamaharajkarun Hospital
Golden Jubilee Medical Center

See also
List of medical schools in Thailand
Faculty of Medicine Ramathibodi Hospital, Mahidol University
Mahidol University

References

External links
Faculty of Medicine Siriraj Hospital, Mahidol University 
Faculty of Medicine Ramathibodi Hospital, Mahidol University, the younger sister medical school of Mahidol University

Siriraj
Siriraj
Siriraj
University departments in Thailand